Postplatyptilia caribica is a moth of the family Pterophoridae. It is known from Dominica and Puerto Rico.

The wingspan is about 14 mm. Adults are on wing in March.

Etymology
The name reflects the area of distribution, the Caribbean islands.

References

caribica
Moths described in 2006